The Territorial Prelature of Huautla is a Latin Church missionary territory or territorial prelature of the Catholic Church in Mexico. It was erected on 8 October 1972. The diocese is a suffragan in the ecclesiastical province of the metropolitan Antequera.

Ordinaries
Hermenegildo Ramírez Sánchez, M.J. (1975–2005) – Prelate Emeritus
Héctor Luis Morales Sánchez (2005–2011), appointed Bishop of Netzahualcóyotl
José Armando Álvarez Cano (2011–2019), appointed Bishop of Tampico, Tamaulipas
Guadalupe Antonio Ruíz Urquín (since 2020)

Territorial losses

External links and references

Huautla
Territorial prelatures
Huautla
Huautla
Roman Catholic Ecclesiastical Province of Antequera, Oaxaca